Def Jam Fight for NY: The Takeover is a 2006 fighting video game for the PlayStation Portable. The game is a port of Def Jam: Fight for NY. In addition to nearly all of the features seen in the original game, The Takeover includes new dirty moves, four new venues, and 68 playable characters.

Story
The game's story is a prequel to the events of Def Jam Vendetta. However, the game uses many of the same situations and characters from Fight for NY, which is the third game in the series, chronologically. The player is still a nameless up-and-coming young street fighter brought into the world of underground street fighting after rescuing one of the game's personalities from trouble with the police. However, instead of D-Mob being freed from police custody, like in Fight for NY, it is tattoo artist Manny who is saved from corrupt police officers. Manny takes the player to gang leader O.G., who becomes his "mentor", who instructs him in how to fight to gain control of (take over) the five boroughs of New York City. Eventually, O.G. is murdered by Crow, leaving D-Mob to step in and use the player as his number one fighter. Ultimately, it is revealed that D-Mob was using the player to take over the five boroughs, controlling New York City's underground, and that he was going to leave the player to take the fall, leading the police to his exact whereabouts. After defeating D-Mob in the story's final battle, a one-on-one fight at the 125th Street Subway Station, the player decides to leave the underground fight scene for good. It is presumed that, since this is a prequel story, D-Mob recovers from the fight and, with nobody in New York to stop him, builds his empire that is seen in Vendetta.

Character creation is still the same as Fight for NY. Just like in the original, only male characters can be created. The players can create own character using the same type of police sketch-artist system. A new addition is choosing their character's home town from one of the five boroughs of New York City. From there, the game flows similarly to Fight for NY, featuring many of the same fighting arenas and shops where the players can upgrade own character's clothing, jewelry, hair, and fighting moves.

The story is no longer told through fully voiced cutscenes. For The Takeover, the story progresses through text and messages are received on their character's Sidekick.

Also, since the game uses many of the graphical assets seen in 2004's Fight for NY, it does not reflect physical changes seen in some of the celebrities featured in the game. For example, Busta Rhymes, in the role of Magic, still has his dreadlock hairstyle, which he cut in late 2005. Also, Ludacris still has his cornrow hairstyle, which he would cut in the summer of 2006.

Gameplay
Gameplay remains largely similar to Fight for NY, although ground combat is further enhanced. The player bases their character's fighting style from among a pool of five different fighting styles.

Reception

The game received "favorable" reviews according to video game review aggregator Metacritic.

References

External links
 

2006 video games
Def Jam video games
Video games based on musicians
Organized crime video games
PlayStation Portable games
PlayStation Portable-only games
Syn Sophia games
Video games developed in Canada
Video games developed in Japan
Video games set in New York City
Video game prequels
Multiplayer and single-player video games